Andreas Lämmel (born 19 April 1959) is a German politician. Born in Falkenstein, Saxony, he represents the CDU. Andreas Lämmel has served as a member of the Bundestag from the state of Saxony since 2005.

Life 
He became member of the bundestag after the 2005 German federal election. He is a member of the Committee for Economics and Energy.
Lämmel will not be reelect in 2021 German federal election.

References

External links 

  
 Bundestag biography 

1959 births
Living people
Members of the Bundestag for Saxony
Members of the Bundestag 2017–2021
Members of the Bundestag 2013–2017
Members of the Bundestag 2009–2013
Members of the Bundestag 2005–2009
Members of the Bundestag for the Christian Democratic Union of Germany